This is a list of episodes for ABC/Toon Disney's Teacher's Pet; It ran for 39 episodes. All found production codes can be found online on an old website called "TV Tome", that featured the show's episode guide.

Series overview

Season 1 (2000-2001)
Note: The first season aired on ABC's One Saturday Morning. All episodes in this season were directed by Timothy Björklund.

Season 2 (2001-2002)

Film

Notes

References

Teacher's Pet (TV series)
Teacher's Pet (TV series)

Lists of Disney Channel television series episodes
Lists of Disney television series episodes